Mophato Moshoete Monyake (born 29 April 1961) is a Lesotho politician with the All Basotho Convention. He was elected Member of Parliament for the Stadium Area in the May 2012 elections. Prime Minister Thomas Thabane named him Minister of Justice the following month.

References

1961 births
Living people
All Basotho Convention politicians
Ministers of Justice of Lesotho
Members of the National Assembly (Lesotho)
People from Emfuleni Local Municipality
Alumni of the National University of Ireland